The 2014 Florida Atlantic Owls football team represented Florida Atlantic University in the 2014 NCAA Division I FBS football season. They were led by first-year head coach Charlie Partridge and played their home games at FAU Stadium. They entered their second season as a member of Conference USA, competing in the East Division. They finished the season 3–9, 2–6 in C-USA play to finish in last place in the East Division.

Schedule

Schedule Source:

Game summaries

Nebraska

Alabama

With 7:53 to play in the fourth quarter, officials delayed the game due to lightning strikes within ten miles of Bryant–Denny Stadium. Both schools subsequently agreed to call the game, and this resulted in the 41–0 Alabama victory.

Tulsa

Wyoming

UTSA

FIU

Western Kentucky

Marshall

UAB

North Texas

Middle Tennessee

Old Dominion

References

Florida Atlantic
Florida Atlantic Owls football seasons
Florida Atlantic Owls football